Halloussiyeh      is a village in Tyre District in Southern Lebanon, located just south of the Litani river.

Name
According to E. H. Palmer, the name could possibly come from the word for "abundant herbage".

History
In 1875, Victor Guérin noted: "This village is divided into two quarters, the lower of which is called Hallusiyeh et Thata, and the upper Hallusiyeh el Foka. The latter occupies the summit of a high hill. The houses of both quarters are rudely built: they may contain about 500 Metawileh."

In 1881, the PEF's Survey of Western Palestine (SWP) described it: "A village, built of stone, divided into two quarters, east and west, with [a] Moslem holy place." They further noted: "The only tradition which connects this village with the past is that a wely consecrated to Neby Mohammed is said to have succeeded an ancient church."

Modern era
In January 1984 Israel soldiers detained the local Imam and five young men from the village. They then used a bulldozer to demolish the Imam’s house.

On 24 July 2006, during the 2006 Lebanon War,  11 civilians, aged 6 to  86 years of age, were killed by Israeli air-strikes.  There were no Hezbollah fighters in the village at the time.

References

Bibliography

External links
 Halloussiyeh, Localiban 
Survey of Western Palestine, Map 2:   IAA, Wikimedia commons

Populated places in Tyre District
Shia Muslim communities in Lebanon